
This is a list of places in the United Kingdom having standing links to local communities in other countries. In most cases, the association, especially when formalised by local government, is known as "town twinning" (though other terms, such as "partner towns" or "sister cities" are sometimes used instead), and while most of the places included are towns, the list also comprises villages, cities, districts, counties, etc. with similar links.

England

Northern Ireland
Antrim and Newtownabbey

 Dorsten, Germany
 Gilbert, United States
 Rybnik, Poland

Ards and North Down
 Virginia Beach, United States

Armagh
 Razgrad, Bulgaria

Ballymena

 Gibraltar, Gibraltar
 Morehead, United States

Ballymoney

 Douglas, Isle of Man
 Vanves, France

Banbridge
 Ruelle-sur-Touvre, France

Bangor

 Bregenz, Austria
 Virginia Beach, United States

Belfast

 Boston, United States
 Hefei, China
 Nashville, United States
 Shenyang, China

Carrickfergus

 Anderson, United States
 Danville, United States
 Jackson, United States
 Portsmouth, United States
 Ruda Śląska, Poland

Coleraine
 La Roche-sur-Yon, France

Cookstown

 Plérin, France
 Wronki, Poland

Craigavon
 LaGrange, United States

Downpatrick
 Bezons, France

Dromore
 Drumore Township, United States

Enniskillen terminated its twinning.

Larne
 Clover, United States

Limavady

 Vigneux-sur-Seine, France
 Westport, Ireland

Moyle

 Ballinasloe, Ireland
 Gaza City, Palestine
 Pourrières, France

Newcastle
 New Ross, Ireland

Newry, Mourne and Down

 Aberdeen, United States
 County Clare, Ireland
 Pinehurst, United States
 Sioux Falls, United States
 Southern Pines, United States

Newtownards
 Kemi, Finland

Omagh terminated its twinning.

Rathfriland
 Armstrong, Canada

Scotland

Wales

References

External links
Extensive list of UK twin towns from the Dorset Twinning Association.
North West Twinning Federation The Federation of Twin Towns and International Friendship Links for North West England and North Wales
List of British Towns twinned with French Towns

United Kingdom
Towns (twin)
Lists of towns in the United Kingdom
Twin towns
Foreign relations of the United Kingdom
United Kingdom geography-related lists
Populated places in the United Kingdom